The following is the list of episodes from the anime series Asura Cryin'. The anime is produced by Seven Arcs and directed by Keizou Kusakawa. The anime first premiered on April 2, 2009 on AT-X. Two pieces of theme music are used for the first season of the anime. The opening theme is titled "Spiral" by Angela, and the ending theme is "Link", also by Angela. A second season aired on October 1, 2009 on AT-X. The opening theme of the second season is "Alternative" and the ending theme is "Kanata no delight" both sung by Angela. The first episode of the second season uses the episode number 14, in chronological order from the first season which ended with 13 episodes.

As of September 29, 2009, Crunchyroll media-distribution website has obtained license to begin simulcasting the Asura Cryin' 2 anime sequel series on September 30, 2009 at 7:00 p.m. PDT. The stream, however, is only accessible to crunchyroll subscribed members in United States, Canada, the United Kingdom, Australia, New Zealand, and Ireland. Normal members only get to view the streams a week later. Streaming for the first season has also been announced by Crunchyroll.

Episodes

First season

Second Season

References

External links
 Anime official site 
 
 Dengeki Online 

Lists of anime episodes